The Isla Colón Formation is an Early Pleistocene geologic formation in the Bocas del Toro Province of northwestern Panama. It preserves coral fossils. The formation, part of the Bocas del Toro Group, comprises limestones and sandstones deposited in a reefal environment.

Fossil content 
 Isophyllia maoensis

See also 
 List of fossiliferous stratigraphic units in Panama

References

Bibliography

Further reading 
 A. F. Budd, K. G. Johnson, T. A. Stemann and B. H. Tompkins. 1999. Pliocene to Pleistocene reef coral assemblages in the Limon Group of Costa Rica. Bulletins of American Paleontology 357:119-158

Geologic formations of Panama
Pleistocene Panama
Limestone formations
Reef deposits
Formations